Business Integration Group, Inc. is a Tempe, Arizona-based provider of Integrated Workplace Management System (IWMS) software and Professional Services.  Founded in 1998, Business Integration Group, Inc. is a wholly owned subsidiary of commercial real estate services firm Cushman & Wakefield, Inc.

BigCenter IWMS 
Business Integration Group Inc.’s platform, known as BIGCenter IWMS, is a web-based application composed of five real estate and facility management specific modules:

•	Facility Center
•	Portfolio Center
•	Occupancy Center
•	Project Center
•	Green Center
Business Integration Group’s IWMS platform is offered to prospective clients under a variety of delivery options that include Software as a Service (SaaS) and License; on either a hosted or self-hosted basis. Functionality is available on an À la carte model, providing clients with the option to select the entire IWMS platform or the specific modules they wish to implement.

Professional Services 
In addition to its IWMS platform, Business Integration Group, Inc. offers its clients additional support via: 24*7 Facilities Helpdesk, Occupancy & Move Management, Preventive Maintenance, Resource Scheduling, Technology Assessment & Implementation Services, and Lease Administration. These services can be selected separately and/or in addition to BIGCenter’s IWMS platform.

Notable Clients 
Business Integration Group, Inc’s IWMS solution and Professional Services are utilized by a number of private and public-sector organizations around the globe.  Some of their more notable clients include Comcast, NBCUniversal, Metropolitan Life, Adobe Systems, Symantec Corporation, UBS, Novell, Prudential Financial, Fireman's Fund Insurance, Sydney Ports of Australia, and Arapahoe County, Colorado.

References 

Information technology companies of the United States